The Krylatskoye Sports Complex Velodrome is an indoor velodrome in the Krylatskoye district of Moscow, Russia. It was built in 1979 according to a design from a team of architects for the 1980 Summer Olympics and hosted the track cycling events. The velodrome is situated on Krylatskaya street, between the Krylatsky Hill and the Rowing Canal.

Construction 
This structure is in the shape of an ellipse with axes of 168 and 138 m. The 168 meter-long span of the bike track is covered by two pairs of inclined arches which are connected by a 4 mm thick rolled steel membrane. The velodrome also accommodates 2 tennis courts, 2 squash courts, a martial arts arena, fitness equipment, a sauna, an athletics arena, a cafe/bar, and a hotel.

A 220×90 m archery complex was built next to the velodrome. The complex included a firing line and a line for setting targets at a distance of 30 to 70 m for women and 30 to 90 m for men.

A circular bike route was also constructed in 1979 on the other side of Krylatskaya Street in the Krylatsky Hills. The cycle path has an asphalt surface and a length of 13.64 km and a width of 7 m.

References

1980 Summer Olympics official report. Volume 2. Part 1. pp. 97–101.

Venues of the 1980 Summer Olympics
Sports venues completed in 1979
Sports venues built in the Soviet Union
Sports venues in Russia
Velodromes in Russia
Olympic cycling venues
1979 establishments in Russia